Henri Knuutinen (born December 27, 1997) is a Finnish professional ice hockey winger currently playing for KalPa in Liiga.

Knuutinen made his Liiga debut for KalPa on November 12, 2016 against HIFK and went on to play 26 games for the team that season, scoring one goal and one assist.

References

External links

1997 births
Living people
Finnish ice hockey forwards
Iisalmen Peli-Karhut players
KalPa players
People from Kiuruvesi
Sportspeople from North Savo